José Manuel García is the name of:

José Manuel García Bedoya, Peruvian politician
José Manuel García (runner) (born 1966), Spanish runner
José Manuel García Guevara (born 1988), Mexican criminal 
José Manuel García (footballer) (1950–2014), Spanish footballer
José Manuel García-Margallo (born 1944), Spanish politician
José Manuel García Maurin (born 1997), Spanish footballer
José Manuel García Naranjo (born 1994), Spanish footballer
Txema Garcia (José Manuel García Luena, born 1974), Spanish-born Andorran footballer